2 is the second studio album by the American indie rock band The Black Heart Procession. It was released on May 18, 1999, by Touch and Go Records.

Track listing

References

1999 albums
Touch and Go Records albums
The Black Heart Procession albums
Albums recorded at Bear Creek Studio